The Battle of Zitácuaro was a battle of the War of Mexican Independence that occurred on 2 January 1812 in the area around Zitácuaro, Michoacán. The battle was fought between the royalist forces loyal to the Spanish crown and the Mexican rebels fighting for independence from the Spanish Empire. The Mexican insurgents were commanded by General Ignacio López Rayón and the Spanish by Félix María Calleja. The battle resulted in a victory for the Spanish Royalists even in the face of overwhelming odds.

Context 
The viceroy of New Spain, Francisco Javier Venegas de Saavedra y Ramínez de Arenzana, ordered the retaking of the city of Heroica Zitácuaro as it was the contemporary site of the "Suprema Junta Nacional Gubernativa", the headquarters for the direction of the entire insurgency against the Spanish crown.

The battle
The two armies came to blows in and around the city of Zitácuaro. During the battle, Ramón López Rayón, the younger brother of the supreme insurgent commander, Ignacio López Rayón, lost his eye. After many hours of battle, the city eventually fell to Spanish forces despite the numerical superiority of the rebel forces.

Aftermath 
In the wake of the rebel defeat at Zitácuaro, the members of the Suprema Junta Nacional Gubernativa were made to flee the city and relocated to the towns of Tlalchapa and Sultepec.

See also 
 Mexican War of Independence

References

Bibliography 

Zitacuaro
Conflicts in 1811
History of Michoacán
Zitacuaro
Zitacuaro
1811 in New Spain
July 1811 events
Zitácuaro